Admiral Harvey may refer to:

Edward Harvey (1783–1865), British Royal Navy admiral
Eliab Harvey (1758–1830), British Royal Navy admiral
Henry Harvey (1743–1810), British Royal Navy admiral
John C. Harvey Jr. (born 1951), U.S. Navy admiral
John Harvey (Royal Navy officer, born 1772) (1772–1837), British Royal Navy admiral
Thomas Harvey (Royal Navy officer) (1775–1841), British Royal Navy vice admiral